The 1924 Pasinler earthquake occurred at 16:34 local time on 13 September in Pasinler, Erzurum, Eastern Anatolia Region of Turkey. It had a surface wave magnitude of 6.8 and reached a maximum felt intensity of IX (Violent) on the Mercalli intensity scale, causing 60 casualties.

See also
 List of earthquakes in 1924
 List of earthquakes in Turkey

References

External links

1924 Pasinler
1924 in Turkey
1924 earthquakes
History of Erzurum Province
September 1924 events
1924 disasters in Turkey